"Time and Chance" is a contemporary R&B, funk, and hip hop song performed by American group Color Me Badd and the lead single and title track from their second album (1993). The song is about how life is about time and chance, with it determining whether good or bad people thrive, or falter in life, and how everyone deals with their own hurt and pain. It was meant to introduce the group to a new "street" audience as hip hop and gangsta rap were becoming more popular.

The song peaked at No. 23 on the Billboard Hot 100 on December 11, 1993, and spend 19 weeks on the chart. It reached No. 9 on the Billboard R&B singles chart. It was their final top-ten R&B hit. The video was played extensively on BET, which helped the performance of the single. The video peaked at No. 1 on BET for the week of November 28, 1993.

Music video
The accompanying music video for "Time and Chance" was directed by Ice Cube, who was recruited by the executives and A&R in Giant Records, in order to give the group more street credibility. The video opens with narration by actor Ossie Davis, as the guys are driving around Los Angeles filming footage for a video, their camcorder gets stolen, and two female LAPD officers rough them up and frame them for drug possession. Sam is driving them around in a black Jeep.

Critical reception
Larry Flick from Billboard commented, "One of the originators of the doo-hop movement returns with wildly infectious pop/hip-hop number that weaves deeply soulful vocals into a smoldering, sexy groove. Watch for producer DJ Pooh to become the red-hot studio entity of 1994; he has crafted a hip but accessible musical foundation that showcases CMB perfectly. First taste of act's new album of the same name should do wonders in establishing a comfy niche at top 40 for a long time to come. Single of the week." Alex Kadis from Smash Hits gave the song three out of five, writing, "It's quite good — a spare and simple harmonised funk-a-long ballad that Prince ought to listen to."

Track listings
 US vinyl, 12, promo"
A1. "Time and Chance" (Funk On A Skunk Mix) – 5:22
A2. "Time and Chance" (Straight Up Mix) – 4:03
B1. "Time and Chance" (Allstar's Six Feet Deep Mix) – 4:33
B2. "Time and Chance" (Album Mix) – 4:20

 US vinyl, 7"
A. "Time and Chance" (Album Version) – 4:20
B. "Time and Chance" (Instrumental) – 4:20

 US CD, single"
A. "Time and Chance" (Album Version) – 4:20
B. "Time and Chance" (Instrumental) – 4:20

 US CD, maxi-single"
"Time and Chance" (Album Mix) – 4:09
"Time and Chance" (Allstar's Six Feet deep Mix) – 4:33
"Time and Chance" (Funk On A Skunk Mix) – 5:21
"Time and Chance" (Allstar's Beat Down Mix) – 4:34
"Time and Chance" (CMB New York Mix) – 5:50

Personnel
Credits and personnel adapted from Time and Chance album liner notes.
Engineer – Warren Woods
Engineer [Assistant] – Josh Achziger
Producer – DJ Pooh
Written-By – Mark Jordan (2)
Written-By, Arranged By [Vocal Arrangements] – Color Me Badd, Mark Denard

Charts

Weekly charts

Year-end charts

References

1993 songs
1993 singles
Color Me Badd songs
Giant Records (Warner) singles
Songs written by Sam Watters